The Iceland men's national under-21 football team is a national under-21 football team of Iceland and is controlled by the Football Association of Iceland. The team is considered to be the feeder team for the senior Icelandic men's national football team. Since the establishment of the UEFA European Under-21 Football Championship in 1978, the team has reached the Euro Championship finals on two occasions, most recently in 2021. In the 2011 and 2021 tournaments they were knocked out in the group stages.

The team is for Icelandic players aged under 21 at the start of the calendar year in which a two-year European Under-21 Football Championship campaign begins, so some players can remain with the squad until the age of 23. As long as they are eligible, players can play for Iceland at any level, making it possible to play for the U21s, senior side, and again for the U21s. This has been the case for several senior team players like Eiður Guðjohnsen, Heiðar Helguson, Jón Daði Böðvarsson and Jóhann Berg Guðmundsson.

History
From 1978 to 2009 the team never qualified for the UEFA European Under-21 Football Championship tournament finals. In late 2010, the team sealed qualification to the championships for the very first team in their history. During the qualification stage they finished second in their group behind the Czech Republic and qualified for the playoffs as a result of being one of the best runners-up in the whole qualification process. Their most notable win came in a 4–1 home victory over Germany. In the next stage they played against Scotland in a two-legged affair in which they won 4–2 on aggregate over the two games.

Their remarkable qualification campaign saw them qualify for the finals where they were drawn against Belarus, Denmark and Switzerland in Group A. In their first two group games they were comfortably beaten by Belarus and Switzerland.  In their final group game they defeated Denmark who were the hosts of the tournament 3–1. Iceland would finish third in the group, level on points with the second placed and fourth placed teams. Following the end of the tournament, UEFA announced its Team of the Tournament with striker Kolbeinn Sigþórsson named on the list.

Iceland qualified to the tournament for the second time in 2021.

Competition records

UEFA European Under-21 Football Championship

UEFA European Under-21 Championship

2023 UEFA European Under-21 Championship qualification

2023 UEFA European Under-21 Championship play-offs 

The four play-off winners qualify for the final tournament.

All times are CEST (UTC+2), as listed by UEFA (local times, if different, are in parentheses).

|}

Recent results and forthcoming fixtures

Current squad
 The following players were called up for the friendly match against Scotland.
 Match date: 17 November 2022
 Opposition: 
 Caps and goals correct as of: 17 November, after the match against 

|-----
! colspan="9" bgcolor="#B0D3FB" align="left" |
|----- bgcolor="#DFEDFD"

|-----
! colspan="9" bgcolor="#B0D3FB" align="left" |
|----- bgcolor="#DFEDFD"

|-----
! colspan="9" bgcolor="#B0D3FB" align="left" |
|----- bgcolor="#DFEDFD"

Recent call-ups
The following players are still eligible for and have previously been called up to the under-21 squad.

|-----
! colspan="9" bgcolor="#B0D3FB" align="left" |
|----- bgcolor="#DFEDFD"
|-----
! colspan="9" bgcolor="#B0D3FB" align="left" |
|----- bgcolor="#DFEDFD"

|-----
! colspan="9" bgcolor="#B0D3FB" align="left" |
|----- bgcolor="#DFEDFD"

Previous squads
2011 UEFA European Under-21 Football Championship squad
2021 UEFA European Under-21 Football Championship squad

Records
Most caps
As of 17 November 2022, the 10 players with the most U-21 caps for Iceland are:

In bold players still playing or available for selection.

Top goalscorers
As of 17 November 2022, the 10 players with the most U-21 goals for Iceland are:

In bold''' players still playing or available for selection.

See also
 Iceland national football team
 Iceland national under-19 football team
 Iceland national under-17 football team

References

External links
 Official Site  
 Official Site under-21 results 
 Profile & squad at UEFA.com

European national under-21 association football teams
Under-21